Chicago Joe and the Showgirl is a 1990 British crime drama film directed by Bernard Rose and written by David Yallop, starring Kiefer Sutherland and Emily Lloyd. The film was inspired by the real-life Hulten/Jones murder case of 1944, otherwise known as the Cleft Chin Murder.

Plot
In the film, Karl Hulten (Kiefer Sutherland) is an American GI who is stalking the black market of London after stealing an army truck and going AWOL. There he meets up with Betty Jones (Emily Lloyd), a stripper with a deluded fantasy world view formed by watching a steady stream of Hollywood film noir and gangster pictures. Seeing Karl, who claims he is Chicago Joe doing advance work in London for encroaching Chicago gangsters, Betty takes the opportunity to set her fantasies to life as she connives Karl into a spree of petty crimes. With luck on their side, the spree keeps escalating, until Betty urges Karl to commit the ultimate crime: murder.

Cast
Kiefer Sutherland as Karl Hulten
Emily Lloyd as Betty Jones
Liz Fraser as Mrs. Evans
John Lahr as Radio commentator
Harry Fowler as Morry
Keith Allen as Lenny Bexley
Patsy Kensit as Joyce Cook
Angela Morant as Customer

References

External links
 
 
 

1990 films
1990 crime films
1990s historical films
British crime films
British historical films
British World War II films
1990s English-language films
Working Title Films films
Films shot at Pinewood Studios
Films set in the 1940s
Films set in London
British neo-noir films
Films directed by Bernard Rose (director)
Films produced by Tim Bevan
Films scored by Shirley Walker
Films scored by Hans Zimmer
PolyGram Filmed Entertainment films
1990s British films